James Cameron Montgomery (April 13, 1915 – June 13, 1982) was an American professional basketball player. He played in the National Basketball League for the Akron Goodyear Wingfoots and averaged 3.3 points per game. He eventually became a vice president at Reynolds and Reynolds.

References

1915 births
1982 deaths
Akron Goodyear Wingfoots players
American men's basketball players
Basketball players from Pennsylvania
Centers (basketball)
Forwards (basketball)
Basketball players from Akron, Ohio
Sportspeople from Johnstown, Pennsylvania
Villanova Wildcats men's basketball players